23rd meridian may refer to:

23rd meridian east, a line of longitude east of the Greenwich Meridian
23rd meridian west, a line of longitude west of the Greenwich Meridian